Robert Lloyd Saucy (May 1, 1930 – March 12, 2015) was an American biblical scholar and professor of systematic theology.

Biography
Saucy was born in Salem, Oregon, and educated at George Fox College (1949–51) and Westmont College (1951–53), earning his A.B. in history. He went on to earn both his Th.M. (1958) and Th.D. (1961) in systematic theology at Dallas Theological Seminary. While completing his graduate studies at Dallas, Saucy served as part-time instructor at the Southern Bible Training Institute, and as part-time pastor at Milligan Bible Church. He was ordained as a minister in the North American Baptist General Conference.

In 1961, Saucy joined the faculty of Talbot School of Theology, where he was appointed distinguished professor of systematic theology in 1989. He was a long-time member of the Evangelical Theological Society, and served as its president in 1972. Saucy was one of only three scholars who worked on both the original 1971 translation of the New American Standard Bible as well as the 1995 update. He was also a faculty member at Rosemead Graduate School of Psychology from 1970 to 1977.

He died March 12, 2015, from injuries sustained in a car accident.  "Minding the Heart: The Way of Spiritual Transformation," published in October, 2013 - and dedicated to his wife, Nancy - was his last book published before his death.

Works

Books

)

 - author of chapters within

) - a revision of The Common Made Holy

References

2015 deaths
1930 births
American Christian theologians
Westmont College alumni
Biola University faculty
Dallas Theological Seminary alumni
Writers from Salem, Oregon
George Fox University alumni
American biblical scholars
Translators of the Bible into English
20th-century translators